W11 Newport is a Stroudley A1X Terrier class  steam locomotive which is based at the Isle of Wight Steam Railway.

History

W11 emerged from Brighton Works in 1878 and was originally numbered 40 and named 'Brighton'.

She was chosen by William Stroudley to represent the LB&SCR at the Paris exhibition in 1878, where many trial runs were made in the Paris area to demonstrate her Westinghouse air brake system.

She was based at Battersea Shed until 1901, when she spent a spell assisting with sea defence works at Newhaven.

She was purchased by the IWCR in 1901, and was overhauled at Brighton Works. She was given the number 11 and repainted in IWCR livery. She arrived on the Island on 8 January 1902.

She passed into the ownership of the Southern Railway in 1923 and was renumbered as W11. She was given the name 'Newport' in 1930.

She was taken out of service in April 1946 and stored, until 22 February 1947 when she was shipped back to the mainland and sent to Eastleigh Works for overhaul.

British Railways took ownership in 1948 and she continued to be active along the South Coast working the Hayling Island branch, the Kent and East Sussex Railway and spells at Brighton, St Leonard's and Newhaven.

She was finally withdrawn from service on 27 September 1963, when she was purchased by Sir Billy Butlin. She was repainted in a yellow livery and was displayed at Pwllheli Holiday Camp until 1973.

Butlin was persuaded to place W11 on a ten-year loan to the Wight Locomotive Society, and she returned to the Island on 27 January 1973.

Preservation
Originally it was planned to have W11 restored at Ryde by British Railways, but after problems arose she was moved to the base of the Isle of Wight Steam Railway at Havenstreet on 17 January 1975, where she was cosmetically restored as IWCR No 11.

She remained on static display until July 1976, when her purchase from Butlin's was completed.

She was finally returned to steam in 1989, progress having been hampered by lack of manpower, finance and workshop facilities.

Having proved to be a powerful, economical locomotive, more than capable of hauling heavily loaded trains on the steeply graded IW Steam Railway, she was withdrawn from service on 24 August 2002 for overhaul.

The Isle of Wight Steam Railway announced in November 2007 that they had placed an order with Israel Newton for a new boiler for W11, the cost of which is believed to be in the region of £70,000. The new boiler arrived in 2010 and after steady progress W11 returned to steam in 2014.

Livery

LB&SCR
 Stroudley's Improved Engine Green. (Her tank sides were inscribed 'Gold Medal, Paris Exhibition, 1878'.)

IWCR
 Lined Black

Southern Railway
 Maunsell lined Olive Green.
 Malachite Green with Sunshine lettering.

British Railway
 BR Standard Mixed-Traffic Black livery with red and white lining.

Preservation
 IWCR Lined Black (IWCR No.11)
 BR Standard Mixed-Traffic Black livery with red and white lining. (BR No.32640)
 Southern Railway Wartime matt black (SR N0. W11)
 SR Maunsell olive green (SR No. W11) *Note (Newport name plate is not present and number is on side tank not bunker)

References

External links 
 Isle of Wight Steam Railway Website

Individual locomotives of Great Britain
A1 40
A1 40
Railway locomotives introduced in 1878
0-6-0T locomotives
Standard gauge steam locomotives of Great Britain